Television Tonga is a Tongan television channel operated by the Tonga Broadcasting Commission. It was founded on July 4, 2000 by King Taufa'ahau Tupou IV. 

The TV Tonga studios and broadcast facilities are located in Fasi-moe-afi, near the Tongan capital Nukualofa. They currently broadcast across Tongatapu, 'Eua and other closely surrounding islands, such as Pangaimotu and 'Atata.

TV Tonga produces a weeknightly national TV news program from Monday to Friday in two versions, English and Tongan; and a week-in-review program on Saturday. They also cover local sports and events of national interest.

While TV Tonga is working in affiliation with overseas broadcasters and becoming more of a relaying station, in 2008 it launched a second channel, Television Tonga 2, for its domestic service. General Manager 'Elenoa 'Amanaki has stated that the second English program channel would leave the original channel, formerly broadcasting 60% in English, 40% in Tongan, for Tongan language programs only.

TV Tonga maintains a website, with an online news service.

References

External links 
 Official website for Radio & Television Tonga

Television stations in Tonga